Thomas Arthur McCormack  (27 April 1883 – 26 June 1973) was a New Zealand artist. He was born in Napier, New Zealand, on 27 April 1883.

In the 1956 New Year Honours, McCormack was appointed an Officer of the Order of the British Empire, for services as an artist.

References

1883 births
1973 deaths
New Zealand artists
New Zealand Officers of the Order of the British Empire
People from Napier, New Zealand